Zacharias Aprem (born 11 March 1966) is the Metropolitan of the Adoor-Kadampanad Diocese and served as the assistant metropolitan of the Southwest American Diocese from 20 September 2017 to 3 November 2022.

Metropolitan

In February 2010, the Malankara Syrian Christian Association met  at Shasthamkotta and elected Zacharias along with six others to become bishops. The  Malankara Metropolitan and Catholicos of the East  Baselios Thoma Didymos I, received Zacharias's profession as Ramban-priest on 21 March 2010. Zacharias was ordained to the episcopate by Didymos I on 12 May 2010 at Mar Elia Cathedral, Kottayam.
On September 17th, 2017, Zacharias was appointed as Assistant Metropolitan of the Malankara Orthodox Diocese of Southwest America.

References

External links
Official website of Malankara Orthodox Church

1966 births
Living people
Malankara Orthodox Syrian Church bishops
Malabar Christian College alumni
People from Malappuram district
20th-century Oriental Orthodox clergy
21st-century Oriental Orthodox bishops